Euphorbia stoddartii is a species of flowering plant in the family Euphorbiaceae, native to islands in the western Indian Ocean: Aldabra, the Chagos Archipelago and Mauritius.

References

stoddartii
Flora of Aldabra
Flora of the Chagos Archipelago
Flora of Mauritius
Plants described in 1978